Daniel Ammann (born 15 December 1982) is a retired Australian professional boxer.

In Ammann's career, he has fought opponents including Shane Cameron, Dominic Vea, Anthony McCracken, Mohamed Azzaoui, Lawrence Tauasa, Brad Pitt, David Aloua, Tony Conquest and Brian Minto. He has also fought future UFC Middleweight Champion Israel Adesanya during his early boxing stint.

During his career he has fought for Commonwealth (British Empire) cruiserweight title, WBC - OPBF cruiserweight title and has won the Australian Cruiserweight title twice and New South Wales State Cruiserweight title once.

Professional titles
Australian New South Wales State
NSW State cruiserweight title (188½ Ibs)
Australian National Boxing Federation
Australian National cruiserweight title (187¼ Ibs)
Australian National cruiserweight title (199½ Ibs)

Professional boxing record

References

1982 births
Living people
Sportspeople from Wagga Wagga
Cruiserweight boxers
Australian male boxers